Avtandil "Avto" Kopaliani (born 13 June 1982) is a Georgian rugby union footballer, currently playing in the top French professional rugby league, the Top 14, for the Aviron Bayonnais club. He previously played for another French club, the US Montauban. His usual position is tighthead prop.

Notes

1982 births
Living people
Rugby union players from Georgia (country)
Rugby union props
Expatriate rugby union players from Georgia (country)
Expatriate rugby union players in France
Expatriate sportspeople from Georgia (country) in France
Georgia international rugby union players